Jack Rees (born 12 May 1989) is a British cyclist, who last rode for UCI Continental team . Rees also worked as the team's Operations Director, and has participated in the 2020 Saudi Tour, the 2018 British National Road Race Championships and the 2018 British National Time Trial Championships.

Personal life
Rees is also a certified British Cycling coach, and regularly coaches at the cycle track at Middlesbrough Sports Village.

References

External links

1989 births
Living people
British male cyclists
Sportspeople from Middlesbrough